Willow City may refer to:

Willow City, North Dakota
Willow City, Texas